Gaze is the eighth studio album by the rock band The Beautiful South. It was released in 2003 on Mercury Records. The release was accompanied by the Gaze With The Beautiful South tour. This was also the band debut for Allison Wheeler who replaced the departing Jacqui Abbott. All songs were written by Paul Heaton and Dave Rotheray.

Track listing
All tracks composed by Paul Heaton and Dave Rotheray
 "Pretty" 3:19
 "Just a Few Things That I Ain't" 2:47
 "Sailing Solo" 3:17
 "Life Vs. The Lifeless" 3:35
 "Get Here" 3:35
 "Let Go with the Flow" 3:13
 "The Gates" 4:11
 "Angels and Devils" 2:49
 "101% Man" 3:05
 "Half of Him" 4:27
 "Spit It All Out" 4:08 (UK only)
 "The Last Waltz" (3:55)
 "Loneliness" (4:52) (UK only hidden track)

CD Single/CDEP B-Sides
As was their usual modus operandi, The Beautiful South included unreleased material on the B-sides of the singles taken from their albums.

from the "Just A Few Things That I Ain't" ECD1
"Just A Few Things That I Ain't"
"Cheap"
"Care As You Go"
"Just A Few Things That I Ain't" (music video)
from the "Just A Few Things That I Ain't" CD2
"Just A Few Things That I Ain't"
"The New Fence"
"A Long Time Coming"

from the "Let Go With The Flow" CD1
"Let Go With The Flow"
"School Daze"
from the "Let Go With The Flow" CD2	
"Let Go With The Flow"
"Don't Stop Moving" (BBC Radio 2 Session) (S. Ellis/S. Solomon/S Club 7)
"Song For Whoever" (BBC Radio 2 Session)

Personnel
The Beautiful South
Paul Heaton - vocals
Dave Hemingway - vocals
Alison Wheeler - vocals
Dave Rotheray - guitar
Sean Welch - bass
Dave Stead - drums
with:
Damon Butcher - piano, keyboards
Gary Hammond - percussion
Tony Robertson - trumpet
Kevin Brown - saxophone
Gary Wallis - programming

References

2003 albums
The Beautiful South albums
Albums produced by Jon Kelly